Jean-Baptiste Vuillaume (7 October 1798 – 19 March 1875) was a French luthier, businessman, inventor and winner of many awards. His workshop made over 3,000 instruments.

Early life

Vuillaume was born in Mirecourt, where his father and grandfather were luthiers.

Career
Vuillaume moved to Paris in 1818 to work for François Chanot. In 1821, he joined the workshop of Simon Lété, François-Louis Pique's son-in-law, at Rue Pavée St. Sauveur. He became his partner and in 1825 settled in the Rue Croix-des-Petits-Champs under the name of "Lété et Vuillaume". His first labels are dated 1823.

In 1827, at the height of the Neo-Gothic period, he started to make imitations of old instruments, some copies were undetectable.

In 1827, he won a silver medal at the Paris Universal Exhibition, and in 1828, he started his own business at 46 Rue Croix des Petits-Champs.

His workshop became the most important in Paris and within twenty years, it led Europe. A major factor in his success was his 1855 purchase of 144 instruments made by the Italian masters for 80,000 francs, from the heirs of Luigi Tarisio, an Italian tradesman. These included the Messiah Stradivarius and 24 other Stradivari.

In 1858, in order to avoid Paris customs duty on wood imports, he moved to Rue Pierre Demours near the Ternes, outside Paris. He was at the height of success, having won various gold medals in the competitions of the Paris Universal Exhibitions in 1839, 1844 and 1855; the Council Medal in London in 1851 and, in that same year, the Legion of Honour.

A maker of more than 3,000 instruments—almost all of which are numbered—and a fine tradesman, Vuillaume was also a gifted inventor, as his research in collaboration with the acoustics expert Félix Savart demonstrates. As an innovator, he developed many new instruments and mechanisms, most notably a large viola which he called a "contralto", and the three-string Octobass (1849–51), a huge triple bass standing 3.48 metres high.

He also created the hollow steel bow (particularly appreciated by Charles de Bériot, among others), and the 'self-rehairing' bow. For the latter, the hair purchased in prepared hanks could be inserted by the player in the time it takes to change a string, and was tightened or loosened by a simple mechanism inside the frog. The frog itself was fixed to the stick, and the balance of the bow thus remained constant when the hair stretched with use.

He also designed a round-edged frog mounted to the butt by means of a recessed track, which he encouraged his bowmakers to use; other details of craft, however, make it possible to identify the actual maker of many Vuillaume bows. The bows are stamped, often rather faintly, either "vuillaume à paris" or "j.b. vuillaume".

Other innovations include the insertion of Stanhopes in the eye of the frogs of his bows, a kind of mute (the ) and several machines, including one for manufacturing gut strings of perfectly equal thickness.

Many of the great bow makers of the 19th century collaborated with his workshop. Jean Pierre Marie Persois, Jean Adam, Dominique Peccatte, Nicolas Rémy Maire, François Peccatte, Nicolas Maline, Joseph Henry, Pierre Simon, François Nicolas Voirin, Charles Peccatte, Charles Claude Husson, Joseph Fonclause, Jean Joseph Martin, and Prosper Colas are among the most celebrated.

Vuillaume was an innovative violin maker and restorer, and a tradesman who traveled all of Europe in search of instruments. Due to this fact, most instruments by the great Italian violin makers passed through his workshop. Vuillaume then made accurate measurements of their dimensions and made copies of them.

He drew his inspiration from two violin makers and their instruments: Antonio Stradivari and his "Le Messie" (Messiah), and Giuseppe Guarneri del Gesù and his "Il Cannone" which belonged to Niccolò Paganini; others such as Maggini, Da Salò and Nicola Amati were also imitated, but to a lesser extent.

Vuillaume made numerous copies of his favorite violin "Le Messie", the more noteworthy among them being:

Vuillaume was able to craft such a perfect replica of "Il Cannone", that upon viewing them side by side, Paganini was unable to tell which was the original. He was able to recognize the master instrument only upon hearing subtle differences in tone during playing.

The copy violin was eventually passed on to Paganini's only student, Camillo Sivori. Sivori owned great violins by Nicolò Amati, Stradivari, and Bergonzi, but the Vuillaume was his favourite. This violin is owned by the Musei Di Genova and displayed in their Palazzo Tursi.

When making these copies, Vuillaume always remained faithful to the essential qualities of the instruments he imitated – their thickness, the choice of the woods, and the shape of the arching. The only differences, always the result of a personal decision, were the colour of the varnish, the height of the ribs or the length of the instruments.

His most beautiful violins were often named after the people who owned them (Caraman de Chimay, Cheremetoff, Doria)

Vuillaume occasionally named his instruments: twelve were named after birds, for example the "Golden Pheasant", "The Thrush" and twelve were named after the apostles such as "St. Joseph" and "Saint Paul". A few others were also named after important biblical characters "The Evangelists" and Millant, in his book on Vuillaume, mentions a "St. Nicholas".

A rare violin by Vuillaume (c. 1874, Paris) showcases inlaid ebony fleur-de-lys designs and is one of the last instruments to come out of Vuillaume's workshop, made a year before his death. Crafted for the famous violin dealer David Laurie, "Label reads: Jean Baptiste Vuillaume a Paris, 3 Rue Demour-Ternes, expres pour mon ami David Laurie, 1874", numbered 2976 and signed on the label. It's a copy of a Nicolò Amati violin originally belonging to Prince Youssoupoff (a Russian aristocrat and pupil of Henri Vieuxtemps). Only six copies were made.

He also had practice violins, known as "St. Cécile violins", made by his brother Nicolas de Mirecourt. Another lesser line, also made by Nicolas, was labelled "Stentor".

His main contribution to violin-making was his work on varnish. The purfling's joints are often cut on the straight and not on the bias as was traditional, in the middle in the pin. His brand is burnt at a length of 1 cm. There is generally a black dot on the joint of the top under the bridge. He used an external mould. The stop is generally 193 mm long. In this respect he follows to the French 18th-century tradition of a short stop (190 mm), which was traditionally 195 mm long in Italy and even 200 mm long in Germany. The violin's serial number is inscribed in the middle inside the instrument. Its date (only the last two figures) in the upper paraph on the back. His violins of the first period have large edges and his brand was then burnt inside the middle bouts. The varnish varied from orange-red to red. After 1860, his varnish became lighter.

In addition to the above-mentioned bow makers, most 19th-century Parisian violin makers worked in his workshop, including Hippolyte Silvestre, Jean-Joseph Honoré Derazey, Charles Buthod, Charles-Adolphe Maucotel, Télesphore Barbé, Paul Bailly and George Gemünder.

Nestor Audinot, a pupil of Sébastien Vuillaume, himself Jean-Baptiste's nephew, succeeded him in his workshop in 1875. Vuillaume died at the height of his career, widely regarded as the pre-eminent luthier of his day.

World record price
London, 30 October 2012 – Sotheby's: GBP 145,250 (US$231,160) – "Saint Paul" J. B. Vuillaume violin copy of the "Messiah" Stradivarius, Paris, circa 1870
London, 28 March 2013 – Bromptons: GBP 162,000 (US$251,619) – J. B. Vuillaume, Paris, circa 1860, after Stradivarius
London, 30 October 2013 – Tarisio Auctions, London: GBP 163,200 (US$262,275) – J. B. Vuillaume violin, Paris
London, 22 October 2019 – Tarisio Auctions: GBP 350,000 (US$452,380, Eur 406,291) – J. B. Vuillaume cello copy of the "Duport" Stradivarius, Paris, 1845
London, 8 June 2021 – Ingles & Hayday: £384,000 (US$533,597) – "Tsar Nicholas"; ex-Stern violin by J.B. Vuillaume, Paris, circa 1840-41

Specimen labels
J.B. Vuillaume No. 4, Chez N.A. Lété rue Pavée-Saint-Sauveur no. 20 á Paris 1823
Jean Baptiste Vuillaume á Paris, rue Croix des Petits Champs
Jean Baptiste Vuillaume á Paris, 3 rue Demours-Ternes

The signature is usually followed by a doubly encircled JBV (J&B are joined). Early on, it was doubly encircled JBV. The labels at "Rue Croix Petits Champs" began using the doubly encircled JBV (J&B joined), which remained the same on "3. rue Demours-Ternes" labels.  In addition, most specimens have a number associated with them.

Awards and medals
In 1827, Silver medal at the French Industrial Exposition of 1827
In 1834, Silver medal at the French Industrial Exposition of 1834
In 1844, Gold medal at the French Industrial Exposition of 1844
In 1849, Gold medal at the French Industrial Exposition of 1849
In 1851, Council medal at the Great Exhibition in London for "new modes of making violins, in such a manner that they are matured and perfected immediately on the completion of the manufacture, thus avoiding the necessity of keeping them for considerable periods to develop their excellencies"
In 1855, Gold medal at the Paris International Exhibition

The Vuillaume family 
 Jean Vuillaume – ancestor of Jean-Baptiste. His historicity is disputed as a fabrication of Jean-Baptiste who may have been trying to create a mythology of family descendants going far back to Italy.
 Claude Vuillaume – oldest family member, a lute maker
 Claude François Vuillaume I (1730–1770)
 Charles François Vuillaume (1755–1779 – particularly known for his workmanship and the mellow and responsive tone of his instruments
 Claude François Vuillaume II (1772–1834) – father of the Jean-Baptiste
 Charles-Francois Vuillaume II (born 1797) – eldest son of Claude François Vuillaume II
 Jean-Baptiste Vuillaume (1798–1875)
 Nicolas Vuillaume (1800–1871) – third son of Claude François Vuillaume II. Made wonderful, high quality instruments in Mirecourt. He would ship some of his instruments to Paris to be later completed by Jean-Baptiste Vuillaume and sold at J.B. Vuillaume’s Paris shop. He also made a brand of instruments called 'Stentor'.
 Nicolas François Vuillaume (1802–1876) – fourth son of Claude François Vuillaume II. The most important luthier of the Vuillaume family next only to his brother Jean-Baptiste. Established his own workshop, with a fine reputation, in Brussels.
 Joseph François Vuillaume (1804–1856) – worked in Mirecourt, then Paris, and finally Lyon.
 Claude-François Vuillaume (1807–1853) – fifth son of Claude François Vuillaume II, father of Sébastien
 Sébastian Vuillaume (1835–1875) – nephew of Jean-Baptiste, worked with his uncle during the golden period
 Vuillaume, Gustave Eugène – born at Mirecourt 1899. Pupil of Mougenot and Jacquent Gand. Workmanship and general appearance qualify this maker as successful in Guarnerian modelling. Oil varnish typically of clear yellow to dark reddish brown.

Players

Charles Auguste de Bériot (1802–1870)
Camillo Sivori (1815–1894), played on a Vuillaume copy of Paganini's "Il Cannone" (which Paganini gave to him).
Ole Bull (1810–1880)
Ricardo Cyncynates (1961), 1873 "The David"
Ferdinand David (1810–1873)
Jean-Delphin Alard (1815–1888)
Henri Vieuxtemps (1820–1881)   c.1874  (now known as ex-Vieuxtemps)
Jules Garcin  (1830–1896)  copy of "Le Messie" (Messiah) Stradivari 1868 without number.
Joseph Joachim (1831–1907)
Sophie Humler (1842- ?)  ex- Sophie Humler copy of Stradivari 1863
Eugène Ysaÿe (1858–1931)
Josef Suk (1874–1935)
Jacques Thibaud (1880–1953)
Jack Benny (1894–1974)    now known as the ex - Jack Benny 1845
Nina Dolce (Georgina Springer) (1897-d.?)  ex- Hamma 1828
Fritz Kreisler (1875–1962)
Efrem Zimbalist (1889–1985)
Naoum Blinder (1889–1965)  	ex-Blinder 1845-50
Toscha Seidel  (1899–1962) copy of the Alard Strad 1860  (now known as ex-Seidel)
Louis Kaufman (1905–1994) copy of  "La Pucelle"  Stradivari #1489 c.1839
Nathan Posner   (collector Beverly Hills, California)   ex-Chimay viola 1865 and ex-Sophie Humler 1863
Pierre Fournier (1906–1986)     ex- 'Count Doria' cello 1863
Ruggiero Ricci (1918–2012) 
Endre Granat (1937) Guarneri copy 1866
 Adolph F. Schrader (Chicago), American, Violinist played on the ex-Garcin 1868 also another Strad copy of 1860  #2390
Henryk Szeryng (1918–1988)  Messiah Strad copy which he gave to Prince Sovereign Rainier III of Monaco
Isaac Stern (1920–2001)  A copy of the "Stern, ex Panette" Guarneri del Gesu of 1737  (c. 1850) also ex-Nicolas I of 1840
Arthur Grumiaux (1921–1986)   1866  (now known as ex-Grumiaux ) now played by Jennifer Koh
Josef Hassid (1926–1950)  ex-Kreisler  (used by Josef Hassid)
Patrice Fontanarosa (1942)
Jean Etienne Drouet (1942–1990) ex- Drouet 1827 No.73" and labelled "Antonius Stradivarius Cremonensis Faciebat Anno 1706"
Pinchas Zukerman (1948) Vuillaume Guarneri copy
Young-Uck Kim ex-Paganini ; ex Kreisler   1860
André Rieu (1949)
Oliver Jaques (Zurich)  ex-Nicolas I:ex-Isaac Stern 1840
 Stewart Eaton ( English, Violist)  'Count Doria'  viola 1848
Barry Hou   ex-Zukerman
Chin Kim (1957) plays on 1843 Stradivari model
Ingolf Turban (1964)
Gennady Filimonov (196?) plays on the ex-Garcin  Vuillaume
Cihat Aşkın (1968)
Giovanni Radivo (1969)
Alexander Kerr (1970)
William Shaub (1992) plays on an 1865 Vuillaume
Michael Jelden (1971)
Manrico Padovani (1973) plays on a Vuillaume 1870 (copy of the Strad Messiah) and on a Vuillaume 1845  (copy of 'Il Cannone' Guarnerius of 1743)Manrico Padovani plays on his Vuillaume Cannone Paganini concerto 1 
Tiffany Wu (1978)
Vilde Frang (1986) plays on an 1864 Vuillaume
Olga Kholodnaya (1987) plays on an 1853 Vuillaume "The Blade"
Hilary Hahn (1979) plays on the ex- Lande of 1864  (copy of 'Il Cannone' Guarnerius of 1743)Hilary Hahn plays her Vuillaume on Danish TV
Nadir Khashimov (1990) plays on an 1828 Vuillaume
Catherine Manoukian (1981), plays on the ex-Ysaÿe Vuillaume
Myvanwy Ella Penny (1984)
Nemanja Radulovic (1985) plays a  J.B. Vuillaume violin from 1843.
Pierre Fouchenneret (1985)
 Lorenzo Gatto (1986) plays a Jean Baptiste Vuillaume 
 Richard Hendrix (1958) plays an early Cannone copy made in 1828.
Modigliani quartet (2003) plays on a J.B. Vuillaume string quartet "The Evangelists" (1863)
EnAccord String Quartet (1998) plays on 2 violins (1829) and a viola (1867) from J.B. Vuillaume
Mark O'Connor plays an 1830s Vuillaume
Hsiao-mei Ku of the Ciompi Quartet performs on a violin made by J.B.Vuillaume
Marinus Snoeren (1976–1983), played on the Vuillaume Cello, currently in hands of Rien Snoeren
Jagdish Mistry  and Rafal Zambrzycki-Payne  of Ensemble Modern both play on violins made by J.B. Vuillaume.
 Laszlo Sirsom (1953)
 Gabriel Voicu since 2019 owner of "ex-Hamma" Vuillaume after playing 26 years on his own "G. Voicu A. Stradivarius"

Quotes

References

Sources

The Hill Collection of Musical Instruments, David D. Boyden, Oxford University Press, London, 1969
 
 Les Edition Montparnasse
Jean-Baptiste Vuillaume, un luthier français, Evelyne Bonetat et Edith Orlando, Amis du vieux Mirecourt-Regain, Mirecourt, 1998.
Jean Baptiste Vuillaume:His Life and Work – David Sackson VSA Vol V No 4
"Jean Baptiste Vuillaume and his Master Workmen, Part IV", Harvey S. Whistler, Violins & Violinists Magazine, January, 1948.
Les violons de maître Vuillaume, Frédéric Laurent, 1998.
Le quatuor Stradivarius Nicolo Paganini Claude Lebet, Les Amis de la Musique, Spa, 1994.
Colloque historique, 1ère rencontre de Mirecourt des 9 et 10 mai 1998, Edith Orlando, Amis du musée de la Lutherie et de l'Archèterie française, Mirecourt, 1998.
Les archets de Jean-Baptiste Vuillaume, Jean-François Raffin, Groupe des luthiers et archetiers d'art de France ; Association des luthiers et archetiers pour le développement de la facture instrumentale, France 1998.
Violons, Vuillaume, Cité de la musique, Musée de la musique, Paris, 1998.
Le Violon, des hommes, des œuvres, Emmanuel Jaeger, Frédéric Laurent et Jean-Michel Molkhou (CD-Rom), éditions Montparnasse / Accord Parfait, 1997.
Les Luthiers Parisiens aux XIX et XX siecles Tom 3 "Jean-Baptiste Vuillaume et sa famille : Nicolas, Nicolas-François et Sébastien" by Sylvette Milliot published by Edition les Amis des la Musique 2006
Jost Thöne / Stephan-Peter Greiner, S.-P. Greiner: Jean-Baptiste Vuillaume, Bildband mit originalgrossen Abbildungen, Bocholt 1998.
Jean-Baptiste Vuillaume – Violins and Violinists Series of Violin Makers published by William Lewis and Son
Les Trésors de la Lutherie Française du XIXe siècle, Paris c 1992
The Reminiscences of a Fiddle Dealer by David Laurie
New Grove Dictionary – David Charlton
Encyclopedia of the Violin – Alberto Bachmann
A. Dandelot: La Société des concerts du Conservatoire (1828–1923) (Paris, 1898)
The Société Des Concerts Du Conservatoire, 1828–1967 
C. Pierre: Le Conservatoire national de musique et de déclamation (Paris, 1900), 760
E. Hondré, ed.: Le Conservatoire de Paris: regards sur une institution et son histoire (Paris, 1995)
W.E. Hill & Sons, Antonio Stradivari: His Life & Work
"Salabue" Strad – monograph
Violins & Violinists – Farga
Antonio Stradivari – Henley
Violin Iconography of Antonio Stradivari – Hebert K. Goodkind
How Many Strads – E. Doring
Antonio Stradivari – Charles Beare

External links

"La petite Fille et l'Octobasse de JB Vuillaume"
A hollow steel bow by Jean-Baptiste Vuillaume, c. 1834
Jean Baptiste Vuillaume: notes on his life and work

1798 births
1875 deaths
Luthiers from Mirecourt
19th-century French people
Burials at Montmartre Cemetery